Just Say Da was Sire Records' Volume 4 of Just Say Yes and was originally released on September 4, 1990 as a winter CD sampler.  It contained remixes and non-album tracks of artists on the label, most of which were considered new wave or modern rock (all would eventually fall under the genre alternative rock). This was the first of the 'Just Say' themed albums to carry the Parental Advisory labeling.

Track listing
 Personal Jesus [Kazan Cathedral Mix] - Depeche Mode
 Drop the Pressure - Merlin
 Star [The Trafalmadore Mix] - Erasure
 Wish Me Luck [Karamazov Mix] - Ofra Haza
 Help Us, Somebody - Chris Thomas
 Candleland [Second Coming Version] - Ian McCulloch
 Breathe [Live From the Gulag] - Ministry
 Girl Tried to Kill Me - Ice-T
 When the Beatles Hit America - John Wesley Harding
 Id Parade - Danielle Dax
 November Spawned a Monster - Morrissey
 Gang of One - Bradford
 Maybe for Sure [Tunguska Event 7" Mix] - Debbie Harry
 Soon - My Bloody Valentine
 Melting Blue Delicious [St. Petersburg Mix] - Wild Swans
 Loaded - Primal Scream

1990 compilation albums
Alternative rock compilation albums
Sire Records compilation albums